Sky High is a 1951 American comedy film directed by Sam Newfield and starring Sid Melton, Mara Lynn, Sam Flint, Douglas Evans and Fritz Feld. The film has music composed by Bert Shefter.

Cast
 Sid Melton
 Mara Lynn
 Sam Flint
 Douglas Evans
 Fritz Feld
 Marc Krah
 Margia Dean
 Paul Bryar
 John Phillips
 Thayer Roberts
 John Pelletti

References

External links
 

1950s English-language films
1951 films
1951 comedy films
Lippert Pictures films
American comedy films
American black-and-white films
Films directed by Sam Newfield
1950s American films